The 1959 Tibetan uprising (also known by other names) began on 10 March 1959, when a revolt erupted in Lhasa, the capital of Tibet, which had been under the effective control of the People's Republic of China since the Seventeen Point Agreement was reached in 1951. The initial uprising occurred amid general Chinese-Tibetan tensions and a context of confusion, because Tibetan protesters feared that the Chinese government might arrest the 14th Dalai Lama. The protests were also fueled by anti-Chinese sentiment and separatism. At first, the uprising mostly consisted of peaceful protests, but clashes quickly erupted and the Chinese People's Liberation Army (PLA) eventually used force to quell the protests, some of the protesters had captured arms. The last stages of the uprising included heavy fighting, with high civilian and military losses. The 14th Dalai Lama escaped from Lhasa, while the city was fully retaken by Chinese security forces on 23 March 1959. Thousands of Tibetans were killed during the 1959 uprising, but the exact number of deaths is disputed.

Earlier in 1956, armed conflict between Tibetan guerillas and the PLA started in the Kham and Amdo regions, which had been subjected to socialist reform. The guerrilla warfare later spread to other areas of Tibet and lasted through 1962. Some regard the Xunhua Incident in 1958 as a precursor of the Tibetan uprising.

The annual 10 March anniversary of the uprising is observed by exiled Tibetans as Tibetan Uprising Day and Women's Uprising Day. On 19 January 2009, The PRC-controlled legislature in the Tibetan Autonomous Region chose 28 March as the national anniversary of Serfs Emancipation Day. American Tibetologist Warren W. Smith Jr. describes the move as a "counter-propaganda" celebration following the 10 March 2008 unrest in Tibet.

Names 
 1959 Tibetan uprising (used by the Central Tibetan Administration)
 1959 Tibetan armed rebellion (used by the government of the People's Republic of China)
 1959 Tibetan anti-tyranny movement (used by the government of the Republic of China)
 1959 Tibetan riots (commonly used in Chinese historiography)
 1959 anti-Chinese uprising in Tibet
 Lhasa uprising

Armed resistance in eastern Tibet 
In 1951, the Seventeen Point Agreement between the People's Republic of China and representatives of the Dalai Lama was put into effect. Socialist reforms such as redistribution of land were delayed in Tibet proper. However, eastern Kham and Amdo (western Sichuan / Xikang and Qinghai provinces in the Chinese administrative hierarchy) were outside the administration of the Tibetan government in Lhasa, and were thus treated more like other Chinese provinces, with land redistribution implemented in full. The Khampas and nomads of Amdo traditionally owned their own land. Armed resistance broke out in Amdo and eastern Kham in June 1956.

Prior to the PLA invasion, relations between Lhasa and the Khampa chieftains had deteriorated, although the Khampa remained spiritually loyal to the Dalai Lama throughout. Because of these strained relations, the Khampa had actually assisted the Chinese communists in their initial invasion, before becoming the guerrilla resistance they are now known for. Pandatsang Rapga, a pro-Kuomintang and pro-Republic of China Khampa revolutionary leader, offered the governor of Chamdo, Ngabo Ngawang Jigme, some Khampa fighters in exchange for the Tibetan government recognizing the independence of Kham. Ngabo refused the offer. After the defeat of the Tibetan Army in Chamdo, Rapga started mediating in negotiations between the PRC and the Tibetan rebels.

Rapga and Topgay engaged in negotiations with the Chinese during their assault on Chamdo. Khampas either defected to the Chinese PLA forces or did not fight at all. The PLA attack succeeded.

By 1957, Kham was in chaos. Resistance fighters' attacks and People's Liberation Army reprisals against Khampa resistance groups such as the Chushi Gangdruk became increasingly brutal. Kham's monastic networks came to be used by guerilla forces to relay messages and hide rebels. Punitive strikes were carried out by the Chinese government against Tibetan villages and monasteries.  Tibetan exiles assert that threats to bomb the Potala Palace and the Dalai Lama were made by Chinese military commanders in an attempt to intimidate the guerrilla forces into submission.

Lhasa continued to abide by the seventeen-point agreement and sent a delegation to Kham to quell the rebellion. After speaking with the rebel leaders, the delegation instead joined the rebellion. Kham leaders contacted the Central Intelligence Agency (CIA), but the CIA under President Dwight D. Eisenhower insisted it required an official request from Lhasa to support the rebels. Lhasa did not act. Eventually the CIA began to provide covert support for the rebellion without word from Lhasa. By then the rebellion had spread to Lhasa which had filled with refugees from Amdo and Kham. Opposition to the Chinese presence in Tibet grew within the city of Lhasa.

In mid-February 1959 the CCP Central Committee's Administrative Office circulated the Xinhua News Agency internal report on how "the revolts in the Tibetan region have gathered pace and developed into a nearly full-scale rebellion." in a "situation report" for top CCP leaders. 

The next day, the Chinese leader saw a report from the PLA General Staff's Operations Department describing rebellions by Tibetans in Sichuan, Yunnan, Gansu, and Qinghai. He again stressed that "rebellions like these are extremely favorable for us because they will benefit us in helping to train our troops, train the people, and provide a sufficient reason to crush the rebellion and carry out comprehensive reforms in the future."

The PLA used Hui soldiers, who formerly had served under Ma Bufang to crush the Tibetan revolt in Amdo. Hui cavalry were stationed in Southern Kham. The situation in all of Tibet became increasingly tense, as a growing number of Tibetans began to support the Khampa uprising, while "anti-Chinese communist agitation" spread among the Tibetans. The regional government in Lhasa neither wanted to back a rebellion nor publicly oppose it. Dissatisfied, the Chinese Communist Party put pressure on the Dalai Lama's government to join the operations against the rebels, and made it increasingly clear that a spread of the insurgency would lead to "all-out repression" in Tibet. In this unstable situation, the Chinese generals resident in Lhasa was summoned back to mainland China, leaving the inexperienced PLA commander Tan Guansen in charge, just as the date of the Monlam Prayer Festival approached. This festival had previously been used by participants to voice "anti-Chinese sentiments".

Lhasa rebellion 

According to historian Tsering Shakya, the Chinese government was pressuring the Dalai Lama to attend the National People's Congress in April 1959, in order to repair China's image in relation to ethnic minorities after the Khampa rebellion. On 7 February 1959, a significant day on the Tibetan calendar, the Dalai Lama attended a religious dance, after which the acting representative in Tibet, Tan Guansan, offered the Dalai Lama a chance to see a performance from a dance troupe native to Lhasa at the Norbulingka to celebrate the Dalai Lama's completion of his lharampa geshe degree. According to the Dalai Lama's memoirs, the invitation came from Chinese General Zhang Jingwu, who proposed that the performance be held at the Chinese military headquarters; the Dalai Lama states that he agreed. However, tibetologist Sam van Schaik stated that the Dalai Lama was the one who proposed that the dance should take place in the military headquarters as the Norbulingka was too small. Both parties did not yet agree on a date, and the Dalai Lama seemed to put the event "out of his mind", focusing instead on his ongoing examinations for his Geshe degree as well as the Monlam Prayer Festival.

Besides Tan and the Dalai Lama, nobody was seemingly informed of the plans for the dance. As a result, planned performance date was only finalized 5 or 3 days beforehand when Tan reminded the Dalai Lama of the dance who suggested 10 March. The decision was seemingly concluded on a whim. Neither the Kashag nor the Dalai Lama's bodyguards were informed of the Dalai Lama's plans until Chinese officials briefed them on 9 March, one day before the performance was scheduled, and insisted that they would handle the Dalai Lama's security. The Dalai Lama's memoirs state that on 9 March the Chinese told his chief bodyguard that they wanted the Dalai Lama's excursion to watch the production conducted "in absolute secrecy" and without any armed Tibetan bodyguards, which "all seemed strange requests and there was much discussion" amongst the Dalai Lama's advisors. Some members of the Kashag were alarmed and concerned that the Dalai Lama might be abducted, recalling a prophecy that told that the Dalai Lama should not exit his palace.

According to historian Tsering Shakya, some Tibetan government officials feared that plans were being laid for a Chinese abduction of the Dalai Lama, and spread word to that effect amongst the inhabitants of Lhasa. On 10 March, several thousand Tibetans surrounded the Dalai Lama's palace to prevent him from leaving or being removed. The huge crowd had gathered in response to a rumor that the Chinese were planning to arrest the Dalai Lama when he went to a cultural performance at the PLA's headquarters. This marked the beginning of the uprising in Lhasa, though Chinese forces had skirmished with guerrillas outside the city in December of the previous year. The protesters publicly pleaded that the Dalai Lama should not attend the meeting with the Chinese officials, claiming that he would be kidnapped. Although CCP officials insisted that the "reactionary upper stratum" in Lhasa was responsible for the rumor, there is no way to identify the precise source. At first, the violence was directed at Tibetan officials perceived not to have protected the Dalai Lama or to be pro-Chinese; attacks on Chinese started later. The protesters also began to use openly anti-Chinese slogans such as "The Chinese must go, leave Tibet to Tibetans".

As protests and violence spread, the Dalai Lama informed the protesters that he would stay at the palace, yet this was no longer enough for the growing crowd. Protesters began to demand Tibetan independence, and urged the Dalai Lama's government to publicly endorse their actions. Barricades went up on the streets of Lhasa, and Chinese and Tibetan rebel forces began to fortify positions within and around Lhasa in preparation for conflict. A petition of support for the armed rebels outside the city was taken up, and an appeal for assistance was made to the Indian consul. Chinese and Tibetan troops continued moving into position over the next several days, with Chinese artillery pieces being deployed within range of the Dalai Lama's summer palace, the Norbulingka.

On 12 March thousands of women gathered in front of the Potala Palace in Lhasa on the ground called Dri-bu-Yul-Khai Thang. The leader of this nonviolent demonstration was Pamo Kusang. This demonstration, now known as Women's Uprising Day, started the Tibetan women's movement for independence.  On 14 March at the same location thousands of women assembled in a protest led by "Gurteng Kunsang, a member of the aristocratic Kundeling family and mother of six who was later arrested by the Chinese and executed by firing squad."

After consulting the state oracle and concluding that the situation had become too unstable, the Dalai Lama and his close confidants opted to flee Lhasa. On 15 March, preparations for the Dalai Lama's evacuation from the city were set in motion, with Tibetan troops being employed to secure an escape route from Lhasa. On 17 March, two artillery shells landed near the Dalai Lama's palace, triggering his flight into exile. The Dalai Lama secretly left the palace the following night and slipped out of Lhasa with his family and a small number of officials. The Chinese had not strongly guarded the Potala, as they did not believe it likely that the Dalai Lama would try to flee. After reaching Lhoka, the Dalai Lama linked up with Kham rebels who began protecting him, and when reaching Lhotse at the Indian border, he proclaimed the restoration of Tibet's independence.

Rumours about the Dalai Lama's disappearance began to spread rapidly on the next day, though most still believed that he was in the palace. Meanwhile, the situation in the city became increasingly tense, as protesters had seized a number of machine guns. At this point, ex-soldiers of the Tibetan Army had joined the protesters' ranks. On 20 March, the Chinese army responded by shelling the Norbulingka to disperse the crowd, and placed its troops at a barricade that divided the city into a northern and southern part in the following night. The battle began early on the following day, and even though the Tibetan rebels were outnumbered and poorly armed, the street fighting proved to be "bloody". The last Tibetan resistance was centered on the Jokhang, where Khampa refugees had set up machine guns, while a large number of Tibetans circumambulated the temple in reverence. The PLA started to attack the Jokhang on 23 March, and a hard-fought, three hours-long battle with many casualties on both sides ensued. The Chinese eventually managed to break through using a tank, whereupon they raised the flag of China on the temple, ending the uprising. Lhasa's streets were reportedly littered with corpses, and at least 4,000 people were arrested. 

Two British writers, Stuart and Roma Gelder, visited the Chensel Phodrang palace in the Norbulingka in 1962 and "found its contents meticulously preserved".

Involvement of the Republic of China 
Pandatsang Rapga, a pro-Kuomintang and pro-Republic of China revolutionary Khampa leader, was instrumental in the revolt against the Communists. The Kuomintang had a history of using Khampa fighters to oppose both the Dalai Lama's Tibetan government, and battle the Communist Red Army.

Rapga continued to cooperate with the ROC Kuomintang government after it fled to Taiwan; they provided training to Khampa rebels against the Communist PLA forces.

The Republic of China on Taiwan disputed with America whether Tibet would be independent, since the ROC claimed Tibet as part of its territory. Rapga agreed to a plan in which the revolt against the Communists would include anti feudalism, land reform, a modern government, and to give power to the people.

The Republic of China continued to claim Tibet as an integral part of its territory in accordance with its constitution, contrary to the claims of the Dalai Lama's Central Tibetan Administration which claimed Tibetan independence.

After the 1959 Tibetan Rebellion, Chiang Kai-shek announced in his Letter to Tibetan Compatriots that the ROC's policy would be to help the Tibetan diaspora overthrow the People's Republic of China's rule in Tibet. The Mongolian and Tibetan Affairs Commission sent secret agents to India to disseminate pro-Kuomintang (KMT) and anti-Communist propaganda among Tibetan exiles. From 1971 to 1978, the MTAC also recruited ethnic Tibetan children from India and Nepal to study in Taiwan, with the expectation that they would work for a ROC government that returned to the mainland. In 1994, the veterans' association for the Tibetan guerrilla group Chushi Gangdruk met with the MTAC and agreed to the KMT's One China Principle. In response, the Dalai Lama's Central Tibetan Administration forbade all exiled Tibetans from contact with the MTAC. Tibetans in Taiwan, who are mostly of Kham origin, support the Republic of China's position that Tibet is part of the ROC, and are against both the Tibetan exile community in India who live under the Tibetan Government in Exile (TGE) and the Communists in mainland China. The Taiwanese Tibetans are considered traitors by the TGE for their position.

Casualties 
Colin Mackerras states, "There was a major rebellion against Chinese rule in Tibet in March 1959, which was put down with the cost of much bloodshed and lasting bitterness on the part of the Tibetans." The Tibetan government-in-exile (TGIE) reports variously, 85,000, 86,000, and 87,000 deaths for Tibetans during the rebellion, attributed to "secret Chinese documents captured by guerrillas". Tibetologist Tom Grunfeld said "the veracity of such a claim is difficult to verify." Warren W. Smith, a writer with Radio Free Asia, writes that the "secret documents" came from a 1960 PLA report captured by guerrillas in 1966, with the figures first published by the TGIE in India in 1990. Smith states that the documents said that 87,000 "enemies were eliminated", but he does not take "eliminated" to mean "killed", as the TGIE does. A TGIE official surnamed Samdup released a report for Asia Watch after three fact-finding missions from 1979 to 1981, stating that a speech by premier Zhou Enlai, published in Beijing Review in 1980, confirmed the 87,000 figure. Demographer Yan Hao could find no reference to any such figure in the published speech, and he concluded, "If these TGIE sources are not reluctant to fabricate Chinese sources in open publications, how can they expect people to believe in their citations of so-called Chinese secret internal documents and speeches that are never available in originals to independent researchers?"

Aftermath 
Lhasa's three major monasteries—Sera, Ganden, and Drepung—were seriously damaged by shelling, with Sera and Drepung being damaged nearly beyond repair. According to the TGIE, members of the Dalai Lama's bodyguard who were remaining in Lhasa were disarmed and publicly executed, along with Tibetans who were found to be harbouring weapons in their homes. Thousands of Tibetan monks were executed or arrested, and monasteries and temples around the city were looted or destroyed.

After the 12 March Women's Uprising demonstration, many of the women who were involved in it were imprisoned, including the leader of the demonstration, Pamo Kusang. "Some of them were tortured, died in prison, or were executed." Known as Women's Uprising Day, this demonstration started the Tibetan women's movement for independence.

The CIA officer, Bruce Walker, who oversaw the operations of CIA-trained Tibetan agents, was troubled by the hostility which the Tibetans showed towards his agents: "the radio teams were experiencing major resistance from the population inside Tibet". The CIA trained Tibetans from 1957 to 1972, in the United States, and parachuted them back into Tibet to organise rebellions against the PLA. In one incident, one agent was immediately reported by his own brother and all three agents on the team were arrested. They were not mistreated. After less than a month of propaganda sessions, they were escorted to the Indian border and released.

In April 1959, the 19-year-old Panchen Lama, the second ranking spiritual leader in Tibet, residing in Shigatse, called on Tibetans to support the Chinese government. However, after a tour through Tibet in May 1962, he wrote a document which is known as the 70,000 Character Petition. The document was addressed to Zhou Enlai and in it, he criticized Chinese abuses in Tibet. Shortly afterward, he met with Zhou in order to have a discussion about the document. The outlined petition dealt with the brutal suppression of the Tibetan people both during and after the PLA's invasion of Tibet and the sufferings of the people in The Great Leap Forward. In this document, he criticized the suppression that the Chinese authorities had conducted in retaliation for the 1959 Tibetan uprising. But in October 1962, the PRC authorities who were dealing with the population criticized the petition. Chairman Mao  called the petition "...a poisoned arrow shot at the Party by reactionary feudal overlords." In 1967, the Panchen Lama was formally arrested and imprisoned until his release in 1977.

In June 1959, the Buddhist monk Palden Gyatso was arrested for demonstrating during the March uprising by Chinese officials. He spent the next 33 years in Chinese prisons and laogai or "reform through labor" camps, the longest term of any Tibetan political prisoner. "He was forced to participate in barbarous re-education classes and He was tortured by various methods, which included being beaten with a club ridden with nails, shocked by an electric probe, which scarred his tongue and caused his teeth to fall out, whipped while being forced to pull an iron plow, and starved." leading to irreversible physical damage. Released in 1992, he escaped to Dharamsala in India, home of the Tibetan government in exile and became an internationally acclaimed activist for the Tibetan independence cause.

Chinese authorities have interpreted the uprising as a revolt by the Tibetan elite against Communist reforms that were improving the lives of Tibetan serfs.  Tibetan and third-party sources, on the other hand, have usually interpreted it as a popular uprising against the alien Chinese presence.  Historian Tsering Shakya has argued that it was a popular revolt against both the Chinese and the Lhasa government, which was perceived as failing to protect the authority and safety of the Dalai Lama from the Chinese.

See also 
 Annexation of Tibet by the People's Republic of China
 History of Tibet (1950–present)
 Human rights in Tibet
 International Campaign for Tibet
 Tibetan Centre for Human Rights and Democracy
 Protests and uprisings in Tibet since 1950
 1987–1989 Tibetan unrest
 2008 Tibetan unrest
 2010 Tibetan language protest
 Events leading to the Sino-Indian War
 Ganden Phodrang
 List of wars involving the People's Republic of China
 Sinicization of Tibet
 Tibetan independence movement
 Tibetan sovereignty debate
 Xunhua Incident

References

Citations

Sources

External links 

 MARCH WINDS , 7 March 2009 – Jamyang Norbu
 Tibetan Government in Exile's account of the events leading to the March 10, 1959, uprising
 Kopel, Dave. "The Dalai Lama's Army". National Review, April 5, 2007.
 Patterson, George N. The Situation in Tibet The China Quarterly, No. 6. (Apr.-Jun., 1961), pp 81–86.
 Ginsburg, George and Mathos, Michael. Communist China's Impact on Tibet: The First Decade. Far Eastern Survey, Vol. 29, No. 7. (July,1960), pp. 102–109.
 The Tibetan Uprising of 1959 

 
Conflicts in 1959
Uprising, 1959
20th-century rebellions
Military history of Tibet
Tibetan independence movement
Protests in China
Rebellions in China
Urban warfare
Proxy wars
March 1959 events in Asia
March observances
1959 protests
History of Lhasa